The shark catfishes form the family Pangasiidae.  They are found in fresh and brackish waters across southern Asia, from Pakistan to Borneo. Among the 30-odd members of this family is the plant-eating, endangered Mekong giant catfish Pangasianodon gigas, one of the largest known freshwater fish. Several species are the basis of productive aquaculture industries in Vietnam's Mekong Delta.

Taxonomy and fossil record

Although Pangasiidae forms a monophyletic group, several studies indicate this group may actually be a subtaxon nested within the family Schilbeidae. Thus, Pangasiidae's familial status may not deserve continued recognition.

Two fossil pangasiid species are described, Cetopangasius chaetobranchus from the Miocene, and Pangasius indicus, from the Eocene.  However, the reported age of P. indicus from the Eocene is debatable, as the Sipang Fauna stratum where it is found has never been officially dated. Therefore, the earliest reliable pangasiid fossil age is of C. chaetobranchus from the Miocene.

Description

The dorsal fin is located far forward, close to the head, and is often high and triangular, thus inspiring the common name. The anal fin is somewhat lengthy, with 26–46 rays. Usually, they have two pairs of barbels, maxillary barbels and one pair of chin barbels, though adult Mekong giant catfish have only maxillary barbels. Pangasiids have compressed bodies and single small adipose fins.

References

External links

 

 
Fish of South Asia
Extant Miocene first appearances
Taxa named by Pieter Bleeker